Edward Grimston (1600–1624), of Bradfield Hall, Essex, was an English Member of Parliament.

Grimston was the eldest son of Sir Harbottle Grimston, 1st Baronet. His great-uncle was the Ipswich MP, Edward Grimston. Grimston was educated at Clare College, Cambridge University in 1616 and Emmanuel College, Cambridge in 1617, with a BA 1618/19. He went to Gray's Inn in 1619. He married Magdalen née Marsham, a daughter of Thomas Marsham of Milk Street, London, and had one son and one daughter. He was buried 28 April 1624.

He was a Member (MP) of the Parliament of England for Harwich in 1621.

References

1600 births
1624 deaths
17th-century English people
People from Essex
People of the Stuart period
Members of the Parliament of England (pre-1707)